The Rova is a river in the center of the Kola Peninsula in Murmansk Oblast, Russia. The Rova originates on the Keivy and flows into the Iokanga. Its biggest tributary is the Kalmyok.

References

Rivers of Murmansk Oblast
Tributaries of the Iokanga